Twelve Moons is an album by Norwegian saxophonist Jan Garbarek recorded in 1992 and released on the ECM label. The title track "Twelve Moons" includes extracts of music composed for the short film A Year Along the Abandoned Road.

Reception 
The Allmusic review awarded the album 4 stars.

Track listing
All compositions by Jan Garbarek except as indicated.

 "Twelve Moons" - 7:37
 "Psalm" (Traditional) - 6:33
 "Brother Wind March" - 10:20
 "There Were Swallows" - 8:39
 "The Tall Tear Trees" - 5:51
 "Arietta" (Edvard Grieg) - 6:24
 "Gautes-Margjit" (Traditional) - 11:58
 "Darvánan" (Mari Boine) - 4:56
 "Huhai" - 7:32
 "Witchi-Tai-To" (Jim Pepper) - 5:43

Personnel 
 Jan Garbarek - soprano saxophone, tenor saxophone, keyboards
 Rainer Brüninghaus - keyboards
 Eberhard Weber - bass
 Manu Katché - drums
 Marilyn Mazur - percussion
 Agnes Buen Garnås, Mari Boine -  vocals

References 

1993 albums
ECM Records albums
Jan Garbarek albums
Albums produced by Manfred Eicher